Mehmandar in Iran may refer to:
 Mehmandar, East Azerbaijan
 Mehmandar-e Olya, East Azerbaijan Province
 Mehmandar-e Sofla, East Azerbaijan Province
 Mehmandar, West Azerbaijan
 Mehmandar, Zanjan

Also 
 Mehmandar (disambiguation)